Belemnoids are an extinct group of marine cephalopod, very similar in many ways to the modern squid and closely related to the modern cuttlefish. Like them, the belemnoids possessed an ink sac, but, unlike the squid, they possessed ten arms of roughly equal length, and no tentacles.  The name "belemnoid" comes from the Greek word βέλεμνον, belemnon meaning "a dart or arrow" and the Greek word είδος, eidos meaning "form".

Belemnoids include belemnites (which belong to order Belemnitida proper), aulacocerids (order Aulacocerida), phragmoteuthids (order Phragmoteuthida), and diplobelids (order Diplobelida).

Occurrence
Belemnoids were numerous during the Jurassic and Cretaceous periods, and their fossils are abundant in Mesozoic marine rocks, often accompanying their cousins the ammonites. The belemnoids become extinct at the end of the Cretaceous period along with the ammonites. The belemnoids' origin lies within the bactritoid nautiloids, which date from the Devonian period; well-formed belemnoid guards can be found in rocks dating from the Mississippian (or Early Carboniferous) onward through the Cretaceous. Other fossil cephalopods include baculites, nautiloids and goniatites.

Anatomy
Belemnoids possessed a central phragmocone made of aragonite and with negative buoyancy.  To the rear of the creature was a heavy calcite guard whose main role appears to have been to counterbalance the front (towards the head) of the organism; it positions the centre of mass below the centre of buoyancy, increasing the stability of the swimming organism.  The guard would account for between a third and a fifth of the length of the complete organism, arms included.

Like some modern squid, belemnoid arms carried a series of small hooks for grabbing prey. Belemnoids were efficient carnivores that caught small fish and other marine animals with their arms and ate them with their beak-like jaws. In turn, belemnites appear to have formed part of the diet of marine reptiles such as Ichthyosaurs, whose fossilized stomachs frequently contain phosphatic hooks from the arms of cephalopods.

Ecology
Belemnoids were effectively neutrally buoyant, and swam in near-shore to mid-shelf oceans.  Their fins could be used to their advantage in all water speeds; in a gentle current they could be flapped for propulsion; in a stronger current they could be held erect to generate lift; and when swimming rapidly by jet propulsion they could be tucked in to the body for streamlining.

Preservation

Normally with fossil belemnoids only the back part of the shell (called the guard or rostrum) is found. The guard is usually elongated and bullet-shaped (though in some subgroups the rostrum may only exist as a thin layer coating the phragmocone). The hollow region at the front of the guard is termed the alveolus, and this houses a chambered conical-shaped part of the shell (called the phragmocone). The phragmocone is usually only found with the better preserved specimens. Projecting forwards from one side of the phragmocone is the thin pro-ostracum.

While belemnoid phragmocones are homologous with the shells of other cephalopods and are similarly composed of aragonite, belemnoid guards are evolutionarily novel and are composed of calcite or aragonite, thus tending to preserve well. Broken guards show a structure of radiating calcite fibers and may also display concentric growth rings.

Diagenetic modifications of the shells are complex. Radiating calcitic crystals are thin, or very large, with a shape indicative of a strong alteration. In other samples, the aragonite - calcite boundary is not dependent on growth lines. In a given fossil sites, some specimens are calcite, others are aragonite.

The guard, phragmocone and pro-ostracum were all internal to the living creature, forming a skeleton which was enclosed entirely by soft muscular tissue. The original living creature would have been larger than the fossilized shell, with a long streamlined body and prominent eyes. The guard would have been in place toward the rear of the creature, with the phragmocone behind the head and the pointed end of the guard facing backward.

Very exceptional belemnoid specimens have been found showing the preserved soft parts of the animal. Elsewhere in the fossil record, bullet-shaped belemnite guards are locally found in such profusion that such deposits are referred to semi-formally as "belemnite battlefields" (cf. "orthocone orgies"). It remains unclear whether these deposits represent post-mating mass death events, as are common among modern cephalopods and other semelparous creatures.

Thunderstones
The name "thunderbolt" or "thunderstone" has also been traditionally applied to the fossilised rostra of belemnoids. The origin of these bullet-shaped stones was not understood, and thus a mythological explanation of stones created where lightning struck has arisen.

Uses
The stable isotope composition of a belemnoid rostrum from the Peedee Formation (Cretaceous, southeast USA) has long been used as a global standard (Peedee Belemnite, "PDB") against which other isotope geochemistry samples are measured, for both carbon isotopes and oxygen isotopes.

Some belemnoids (such as Belemnites of Belemnitida) serve as index fossils, particularly in the Cretaceous Chalk Formation of Europe, enabling geologists to date the age the rocks in which they are found.

Classification 
Note: all families extinct

Clade Belemnoidea
 Basal and unresolved
 Genus Jeletzkya
 Genus Belemnotheutis
 Order Aulacocerida
 Family Aulacoceratidae
 Family Dictyoconitidae
 Family Hematitidae
 Family Palaeobelemnopseidae
 Family Xiphoteuthidae
 Order Belemnitida
 Suborder Belemnitina
 Family Cylindroteuthidae
 Family Hastitidae
 Family Oxyteuthidae
 Family Passaloteuthidae
 Family Salpingoteuthidae
 Suborder Belemnopseina
 Family Belemnitellidae
 Family Belemnopseidae
 Family Dicoelitidae
 Family Dimitobelidae
 Family Duvaliidae
 Suborder Belemnotheutina
 Family Belemnotheutidae
 Family Chitinobelidae
 Family Sueviteuthidae
 Order Diplobelida
 Family Chondroteuthidae
 Family Diplobelidae
 Order Phragmoteuthida
 Family Phragmoteuthidae
 Family Rhiphaeoteuthidae

See also 
 Nautiloidea
 Ammonoidea
 List of belemnites

References

External links
TONMO.com Cephalopod Fossils articles and discussion forums

 
Mesozoic cephalopods
Paleozoic cephalopods
Cephalopods by classification
Cretaceous cephalopods
Carboniferous cephalopods
Devonian cephalopods
Permian cephalopods
Jurassic cephalopods
Triassic cephalopods
Devonian first appearances
Maastrichtian extinctions